Metamorphosis was a concert residency by American singer-songwriter Janet Jackson at Park Theater located in the Park MGM hotel and casino in Las Vegas, Nevada. It began on May 17, 2019, and concluded on August 17, 2019. The show featured songs from Jackson's music catalog, and also celebrated the thirty-year anniversary of Janet Jackson's Rhythm Nation 1814 (1989). The concert was produced by Live Nation Entertainment.

Jackson earned $12.9 million within 18 dates, making the residency one of the most lucrative to emerge from Vegas' live music performances to date. "Metamorphosis" positions Janet in the middle of a career upswing, averaging and outpacing other Vegas acts in sales, grossing an average of $722,000 with 4,000 tickets per night. She also scored the 5th highest average gross in a Las Vegas Residency opening run by a female artist.

Set list 
This set list is representative of the show on May 17, 2019. It may not represent all concerts for the duration of the residency.

 "Intro"
 "Empty"
 "Feedback" 
 "Trust a Try" / "If" / "You"
 "20 Part 2" (Interlude) 
 "What Have You Done for Me Lately" 
 "Control" / "Nasty" / "The Pleasure Principle" 
 "When I Think of You" / "R&B Junkie" / "The Best Things in Life Are Free"
 "Are You" 
 "That's the Way Love Goes" / "Got 'til It's Gone"
 "Come Back to Me" / "Funny How Time Flies (When You're Having Fun)" / "Let's Wait Awhile"
 "China Love"
 "Together Again" / "All for You"
 "Ruff" 
 "I Get Lonely" / "Moist"
 "Any Time, Any Place"
 "DJ Set"
 "Go Deep"  / "Come On Get Up" / "Rock with U" / "Throb"
 "All Nite (Don't Stop)" (Contains elements from "Burnitup!")
 Short Film (Contains elements from "This Body", "Nasty", and "Burnitup!")
 "T.V." 
 "State of the World" / "The Knowledge"
 "Let's Dance" 
 "Miss You Much" / "Love Will Never Do (Without You)" / "Alright" / "Escapade" / "Black Cat"
 "Pledge" 
 "Rhythm Nation"
 "Morning" 
 "Doesn't Really Matter"
 "So Excited"
 "Made for Now"

Shows

References

2019 concert residencies
Concert residencies in the Las Vegas Valley
Janet Jackson
Park MGM